A list of selected species of the huge legume genus Inga.

A

 Inga adenophylla
Inga alba – White Ice-cream-bean
 Inga allenii 
 Inga amazonica L.Cardenas
 Inga amboroensis 
 Inga andersonii
 Inga approximata 
 Inga aptera 
 Inga arenicola 
 Inga augusti

B
 Inga balsapambensis 
 Inga barbata Benth.
 Inga bella 
 Inga bicoloriflora
 Inga bijuga 
 Inga blanchetiana  
 Inga bollandii 
 Inga bracteifera 
 Inga bullata 
 Inga bullatorugosa

C
 
 Inga cabelo – Cabelo Ice-cream-bean
 Inga calantha
 Inga calanthoides 
 Inga calcicola
 Inga canonegrensis
 Inga carinata
 Inga caudata
 Inga chiapensis 
 Inga cinnamomea – Giant Ice-cream-bean
 Inga coragypsea 
 Inga cordistipula Mart.
 Inga cuspidata 
 Inga cynometrifolia

D
 Inga densiflora Benth. – Mountain Ice-cream-bean, Pacay del Monte
 Inga disticha Benth.
 Inga dominicensis 
 Inga dwyeri

E
 Inga edulis Mart. – Ice-cream-bean (= I. vera Kunth, I. vera sensu Brenan)
 Inga enterolobioides 
 Inga exalata T.S.Elias
 Inga exfoliata
 Inga exilis
 Inga extra-nodis

F

 Inga fastuosa 
 Inga feuilleei – Pacay (= I. edulis sensu auct.)
 Inga fosteriana

G
 Inga gereauana 
 Inga golfodulcensis 
 Inga goniocalyx 
 Inga grazielae

H
 Inga hayesii Benth.
 Inga herrerae
 Inga hispida – Hairy Ice-cream-bean

I
 Inga interfluminensis
 Inga ismaelis

J
 
 Inga jaunechensis
 Inga jimenezii
 Inga juniciul

L
 Inga lacustris 
 Inga lanceifolia 
 Inga latipes
 Inga laurina (Sw.) Willd. – Small Ice-cream-bean
 Inga lenticellata 
 Inga lentiscifolia
 Inga leptantha 
 Inga leptingoides
 Inga litoralis

M
 
 Inga macarenensis 
 Inga macrantha
 Inga macrophylla – Chinelo Ice-cream-bean
 Inga marginata Willd.
 Inga maritima
 Inga martinicensis  
 Inga megalobotrys 
 Inga mendoncaei
 Inga micheliana Harms
 Inga microcalyx 
 Inga mortoniana 
 Inga mucuna
 Inga multicaulis 
 Inga multinervis

N
 Inga neblinensis

O
 Inga oerstediana Benth.

P
 
 Inga pauciflora Walp. & Duchass.
 Inga pallida
 Inga pilosula (Rich.) J.F.Macbr. 1943
 Inga pedunculata
 Inga platyptera 
 Inga pleiogyna 
 Inga pluricarpellata 
 Inga porcata
 Inga portobellensis
 Inga praegnans 
 Inga punctata Willd.

R
 Inga ruiziana G.Don  (= I. fagifolia G.Don)

S
 

 Inga saffordiana 
 Inga salicifoliola 
 Inga saltensis 
 Inga santaremnensis 
 Inga sapindoides Willd.
 Inga sarayacuensis
 Inga sellowiana
 Inga semialata (Vell.) C. Mart.
 Inga sertulifera DC.
 Inga sessilis (Vell.) Mart.
 Inga silanchensis 
 Inga sinacae
 Inga skutchii
 Inga spectabilis Willd. – Machete Ice-cream-bean, Guamo Macheto
 Inga spiralis
 Inga stenophylla 
 Inga suberosa
 Inga subnuda Salzm. ex Benth.
 Inga suborbicularis

T
 Inga tenuicalyx 
 Inga tenuiloba
 Inga thibaudiana
 Inga tomentosa – Fuzzy Ice-cream-bean

U
 Inga umbellifera (Vahl) DC.
 Inga unica

V
 Inga velutina – Velvet Ice-cream-bean
 Inga vera Willd. – Churimo Ice-cream-bean
 Inga vulpina – Fox Ice-cream-bean

X
 Inga xinguensis Ducke

Y
 
 Inga yasuniana

References

External links

 International Legume Database & Information Service: Genus Inga. Version 10.01, November 2005. Retrieved 2007-DEC-17.

Inga